Inversions is an album, released on 28 June 2019, by British singer-songwriter and pianist Belinda O'Hooley. Jude Rogers in The Guardian called it "a set of beautiful piano and spoken-word pieces". Mike Ainscoe, for Louder Than War, described it "a series of touching and heartfelt outpourings...Revealing and yes, in a way, cathartic, Inversions captures Belinda O'Hooley at her most insightful".

In a four-starred review for the Morning Star, Steve Johnson said: "This mainly instrumental solo album showcases O'Hooley's talents as a pianist and composer, inspired by her family musical heritage following the passing of her father in 2017. The Swallows Tail and The Bonny Boy come from her father's musical background in the rural Irish west, while Cadair Idris and Aran Fawddwy are inspired by the mountains and valleys of Snowdonia where the album was recorded...as an instrumental album this is an enjoyable and relaxing experience from an artist at the height of her powers."

Track listing

Musicians

 Belinda O'Hooley: piano, vocals, accordion, percussion
 Heidi Tidow: backing vocals, spoken word
 Michael McGoldrick: uillean pipes, whistle

Production and design
The album was recorded and produced by Heidi Tidow, and was mixed and mastered by Neil Ferguson.

Martin Roswell at Simply Marvellous Music undertook the CD design and layout. The cover artwork is by Kate Aughey, with photographs by Hannah Webster, Belinda O'Hooley and Heidi Tidow. The sleeve notes are by Belinda O'Hooley.

References

Further reading
Mustarde, Danielle (13 August 2019). "Inversions: In conversation with Belinda O'Hooley", Diva. Retrieved 13 October 2019.

2019 albums
Belinda O'Hooley albums
Celtic albums by English artists